In enzymology, a hippurate hydrolase is an enzyme that catalyzes the chemical reaction

hippurate + H2O  benzoate + glycine

Thus, the two substrates of this enzyme are hippurate and H2O, whereas its two products are benzoate and glycine.

This enzyme belongs to the family of hydrolases, those acting on carbon-nitrogen bonds other than peptide bonds, specifically in linear amides.  The systematic name of this enzyme class is N-benzoylamino-acid amidohydrolase. This enzyme participates in phenylalanine metabolism.

References

 
 
 

EC 3.5.1
Enzymes of unknown structure